Heritage International Ministries (H.I.M.) is an Evangelical Christian hotel & convention center in Fort Mill, South Carolina.

History 
MorningStar Ministries was founded by Rick Joyner and wife Julie in 1985. In 2004, MorningStar Fellowship Church purchased Heritage USA.

MorningStar holds church services in the hotel atrium and has restored practically all of the 501 hotel rooms. The hotel is now used as a retreat and conference center. The adjacent Main Street USA shops have been reopened and are used as retail shops and classrooms; the hotel rooms above were converted into apartments/dormitories.

In 2007, plans for the uncompleted high-rise tower included an assisted-living facility/retirement complex; if and when completed, it will be known as Heritage Towers. The Sand Castle was demolished in 2013, due to it "being too expensive to do anything with".

In June 2021, MorningStar Ministries held a groundbreaking and dedication ceremony to celebrate the starting of renovations to the 21-story tower. They claim the development will be a, "close-knit residential community for active adult Christians." Local journalists attempted to get the permits and building plans from York County but no permits or plans had been applied for nor submitted. This comes after a 2018 federal lawsuit filed by Morningstar Ministries accusing York County of religious discrimination for blocking attempts to renovate the tower. In a separate lawsuit, York County contends the property is a nuisance and didn’t meet financing requirements. In that case, the South Carolina Supreme Court ruled in favor of the county.

References

External links
Heritage International Ministries (official).
The Nehemiah Project (official building restoration website).

Hotels in South Carolina
Fort Mill, South Carolina
Buildings and structures in York County, South Carolina
Pentecostalism in the United States
Hotels established in 1978
1978 establishments in South Carolina